Dominique Walter (born Dominique Gruère, 22 May 1942 – 26 August 2013) was a French singer. He was born in Paris and is the son of singer Michèle Arnaud. In 1966, he represented France at the Eurovision Song Contest with the song Chez Nous. At the close of voting, it had received just 1 point, placing it 16th in a field of 18 competitors. Serge Gainsbourg wrote seven songs for him between 1966 and 1969. However the songs were not well received, arguably due to the harsh, at times misogynistic lyrics. For example, the title of 'Les Petits Boudins' (1967) is French slang which refers to ugly girls.

References

External links
 http://www.dominiquewalter.com/

French musicians
Eurovision Song Contest entrants for France
Eurovision Song Contest entrants of 1966
Singers from Paris
1942 births
2013 deaths